Denis O'Leary (January 22, 1863 – September 27, 1943) was an American educator, lawyer, and politician who served as Queens County district attorney and for one year as a member of the United States House of Representatives from New York, from 1913 to 1914.

Biography
O'Leary was born on January 22, 1863, in Manhasset, Long Island, New York. He attended and later taught in the public schools. He was graduated from the law school of New York University in 1890. O`Leary was admitted to the bar the same year and commenced practice in New York City.

Political career 
He was assistant corporation counsel of New York City in 1905 and 1906 and commissioner of public works of Queens Borough in 1911 and 1912.

Congress 
O`Leary was elected as a Democrat to the Sixty-third Congress and served from March 4, 1913, until December 31, 1914, when he resigned.

District attorney 
He later served as district attorney of Queens County 1915-1921.

Later career and death 
He resumed the practice of law until 1929 when he retired. He died in Douglaston, Queens County, N.Y., September 27, 1943.

References

New York Times, Denis O'Leary, 80, Ex-Representative; Gave Up Congress Seat to Win Queens District Attorneyship, September 28, 1943

1863 births
1943 deaths
New York University School of Law alumni
Democratic Party members of the United States House of Representatives from New York (state)
People from Manhasset, New York
Queens County (New York) District Attorneys
New York (state) Republicans

Members of the United States House of Representatives from New York (state)